Chushal (also Romanized as Chūshal, Chooshal, Choushal’, Chowshāl; also known as  Chū Ahl) is a village in Malfejan Rural District, in the Central District of Siahkal County, Gilan Province, Iran. At the 2006 census, its population was 179, in 52 families.

References 

Populated places in Siahkal County